Susan Watkins (June 5, 1875 – June 18, 1913) was an American artist, known for painting in the styles of realism and impressionism.  She studied under William Merritt Chase and Raphaël Collin.  Two of her pieces are on permanent display at the Chrysler Museum of Art in Norfolk, Virginia.

Early life 

Susan Watkins was born on June 5, 1875 in Lake County, California to the prominent and wealthy San Francisco family of Susan Ella Owens and James Thomas Watkins.  Her father was a California newspaper editor.  Her grandfather, Commodore James T. Watkins,  was a trans-Pacific ship captain.  He was regarded as a hero for saving the passengers and crew of a ship caught in a storm en route from San Francisco to New York.  John Greenleaf Whittier wrote a poem about this heroic act titled "The Three Bells".  She had two siblings- a brother, James and a sister, Eleanor Watkins Reeves (the subject of her later work Lady in Yellow, and wife of  Joseph Mason Reeves).

Watkins attended E. L. Murison School in California and later, Gibbons School in New York City.  At age 15 she moved to New York City, where her father began work as an editor for The New York Sun.  While in New York from 1890 - 1896 she studied at the Art Students League of New York and was taught by William Merritt Chase.  Chase once referred to her as "the best woman painter living".

After Watkins's father died in 1896, she and her mother moved to Paris and her mother encouraged her to pursue her interest in painting.  She was likely drawn to France to continue her studies because the French government at the time supported artists in ways that the United States did not.  In Paris, Watkins studied under Raphaël Collin at the Académie Julian for ten years, and was recognized as one of his finest students.  Collin instructed his students on drawing, anatomy, and studies of the nude model with the ultimate goal of understanding and accurately depicting the human form.  The Chrysler Museum of Art has numerous sketches - referred to as académies - drawn by Watkins during her time at the Académie, which demonstrate her comprehension of Collin's teachings.

Career and honors 

 1899 Honorary Mention, La Petite Hollandaise, Paris Salon
 1901 Third-Class Gold Medal, The 1830 Girl, Paris Salon - the highest award given to American artists at the time
1901 Certificate of Honorable Mention from The Society of French Artists
 1904 Silver Medal, Louisiana Purchase Exposition, St. Louis
 1906 Exhibition at Alaska-Yukon Expo in Seattle
 1910 Julia A. Shaw Memorial Prize for best painting or sculpture by an American woman, National Academy of Design, New York
 1910 Exhibition at Vickery, Atkins & Torrey
1912 Associate Member, National Academy of Design
1912 Prize at the Carnegie Institute in Pittsburgh
Exhibition at the Art Institute of Chicago
Exhibition at the Corcoran Art Gallery, Washington, D.C.
McMillin Prize, Woman's Art Club, New York City
 Exhibition at Mark Hopkins Institute of Art in San Francisco, now the San Francisco Art Institute
1985 Exhibition at the Chrysler Museum of Art, "Between Continents and Centuries: Susan Watkins, An American Artist Rediscovered"
2003 Exhibition at the Chrysler Museum of Art, "Gentle Modernist: The Art of Susan Watkins"

Style and subject matter 

The majority of Watkins's paintings are of landscapes, portraits, and interiors and primarily oil paintings on canvas or board.  Her earlier works lean towards realism - with dark tones and clear details, while her later works are more colorful and Impressionist in style.  Her early, dark-toned paintings are evocative of 17th century Dutch paintings.  She was likely influenced by differing art styles while working in the United States and later, in Europe.  In 1906, Watkins visited Italy with suitor, Goldsborough Serpell with destinations including Capri, an island near Naples.  She painted a series of colorful Impressionist paintings featuring young local boys picking grapes on the island.  Possibly her largest painting is "Marguerite" at approximately 79 x 37 inches (201 x 94 cm), painted in 1906.  It is speculated that Marguerite was a maid that worked for Watkins while she lived in France.  Along with numerous oil paintings, Watkins also created academic drawings and sketches.  A Young Girl was the final portrait painted by Watkins - a portrait of Walter S. Martin's daughter.

Personal life 

Watkins became ill while traveling in Europe, and returned to the United States in 1910.  She married long-time suitor, Goldsborough Serpell II on January 16, 1912 in Norfolk, Virginia.  Because Watkins was financially independent and encouraged by her mother not to marry, she was disinterested in marriage for many years.  Despite her independent nature, she did not seem to be a supporter of women's suffrage.  She is quoted saying "a woman who is really occupied with the real things of life is so busy accomplishing them that she hasn't any thought of such things".

Her husband, Goldsborough Serpell II was born in Connellsville, Pennsylvania.  His father, Goldsborough McDowell Serpell I worked as a civil engineer for the Louisville & Nashville Railroad and the Baltimore & Ohio Railroad.  Goldsborough Serpell I later founded the Tunis-Serpell Lumber Company and built the Norfolk & North Carolina Railroad to transport lumber.  He served in Company B of the First Maryland Cavalry in the Civil War.  Goldsborough II was a Norfolk banker, member of the Norfolk Executive Committee Southern Commercial Congress, board chairman of Seaboard Citizens National Bank, and president of the United Owners Realty Corporation in Norfolk.  He graduated in 1895 from the Virginia Military Institute in Lexington, Virginia.  He is mentioned as an usher in a 1902 volume of Town & Country (magazine).  While married, the couple lived on Duke Street in Norfolk, Virginia. A 1910 census shows that her husband lived at 108 Duke Street, Norfolk, Virginia. 

Susan Watkins Serpell died on June 18, 1913 in Johns Hopkins Hospital in Baltimore, Maryland.  She was 38 years old.  Her body was transported back to Norfolk, Virginia to be buried.  It is not clear what illness afflicted Watkins, but sources speculate it was likely cancer.  After her death, her husband lived at the Serpell family home at 902 Westover Avenue. The Serpell family home - called the Serpell House - was a three-story, 40 room residence built in 1907 on the corner of Hampton Boulevard and Westover Avenue.  It was the first private residence in Norfolk to have an elevator.  Serpell's father, Goldsborough McDowell Serpell I, hired butler William Hendricks, who served the household for over 70 years.  Hendricks polished the family silver, served meals, maintained the lavish flower garden, decorated the house for the holidays, and chauffeured the family until his death.

Her husband died in 1946 at age 70, and left 62 of her paintings to the Norfolk Museum of Arts and Sciences - what is now the Chrysler Museum of Art.  Watkins pieces that are not displayed or stored at the Chrysler Museum are in private collections.  It is hypothesized that she would have become famous similar to the likes of Mary Cassatt, Cecilia Beaux, and Georgia O'Keeffe if not for her untimely death at the age of 38.  She is seen as a pioneer in the fine art field in the 19th and 20th centuries, when women were not typically welcomed or awarded high praise in the community.  She was Episcopalian.  Watkins and Serpell are buried next to each other in Elmwood Cemetery in Norfolk, plot EXT 16-L8.

Gallery

Realism

Impressionism

Sketches

Self-Portraits

Photographs of Watkins and relatives

References 

1857 births
1913 deaths
Artists from San Francisco
19th-century American painters
19th-century American women artists
American women painters